Luigi Federzoni (27 September 1878 – 24 January 1967) was a twentieth-century Italian nationalist and later Fascist politician.

Biography
Federzoni was born in Bologna. Educated at the university there, he took to journalism and literature, and for several years was on the staff of the newspaper Giornale d'Italia in Rome. He was also among the editors of the weekly newspaper L'Idea Nazionale.

Among the founders of the Nationalist movement, which later on identified itself with fascism, he was elected a deputy for one of Rome's divisions, at the elections of 1913. In the chamber he never missed an opportunity to combat the Socialists, Republicans and Democrats.

He endorsed Italy joining World War I on the side of France and the United Kingdom against Austria-Hungary and Germany. As soon as Italy intervened in the war, he joined the army as a lieutenant of artillery and was awarded a medal for valour.

Federzoni supported Benito Mussolini when the latter issued his manifesto of 26 October 1922, announcing the march on Rome. In the cabinet formed by Mussolini five days later, Federzoni was minister for the colonies. After the Matteotti murder in June 1924, Mussolini selected Federzoni for the post of minister of the interior from 1924 to 1926 and he was president of the senate from 1929 to 1939. He was also president of the Royal Academy of Italy (founded by Mussolini).

At the historic meeting of the Grand Council of Fascism held on 25 July 1943, he was among those who voted for Dino Grandi's Ordine del giorno which led to Mussolini's downfall.

Luigi Federzoni died in Rome on 24 January 1967.

Works
Il corruttore, Bologna, Zanichelli, 1900.
Candidati all'immortalità. (Prima serie), come Giulio De Frenzi, Bologna, Zanichelli, 1904. 
Il sandalo d'Apelle. Note su l'arte contemporanea, come Giulio De Frenzi, Bologna, Libr. Treves di L. Beltrami Edit., 1904.
L'allegra verità, come Giulio De Frenzi, Milano, De Mohr, Antongini e C., 1905. 
Il lucignolo dell'ideale, come Giulio De Frenzi, Napoli, Ricciardi, 1909.
Per l'italianità del "Gardasee", come Giulio De Frenzi, Napoli, Ricciardi, 1909.
Di alcuni libri del 1909. Note bibliografiche, come Giulio De Frenzi, con Alberto Lumbroso, Roma, Libreria editrice della Rivista di Roma, 1910.
Un eroe: Alfredo Oriani, come Giulio De Frenzi, Roma, Libreria della Rivista di Roma, 1910.
Ignacio Zuloaga, come Giulio De Frenzi, Roma, Garzoni-Provenzani, 1912.
L'Italia nell'Egeo, come Giulio De Frenzi, Roma, Garzoni-Provenzani, 1913.
L'italiano errante. Giacomo Casanova di Seingalt, come Giulio De Frenzi, Napoli, Ricciardi, 1913.
La Dalmazia che aspetta, Bologna, Zanichelli, 1915.
Popolari e nazionalisti, Bologna, La tip. nazionale, 1921.
Il Trattato di Rapallo. Con un'appendice di documenti, Bologna, Zanichelli, 1921.
Presagi alla nazione. Discorsi politici, Milano, Casa editrice Imperia del Partito nazionale fascista, 1924; Milano, Mondadori, 1925.
Paradossi di ieri, Milano, Mondadori, 1926.
Venti mesi di azione coloniale, Milano, Mondadori, 1926.
Rinascita dell'Africa romana, Bologna, Zanichelli, 1929.
Il ritorno di Giosuè Carducci, Bologna, Zanichelli, 1932.
I problemi attuali dell'agricoltura italiana, studi raccolti e coordinati da, Bologna, Zanichelli, 1933. 
A. O.. Il "Posto al sole", Bologna, Zanichelli, 1936.
Parole fasciste al Sud America, Bologna, Zanichelli, 1938.
L'ora della Dalmazia, Bologna, Zanichelli, 1941.
Esercito e impero. [9 maggio 1941], in Pagine sulla guerra alla radio, Firenze, Sansoni, 1941.
Bologna carducciana, Bologna, Cappelli, 1961.
Italia di ieri per la storia di domani, Milano, Mondadori, 1967.
1927: diario di un ministro del fascismo, Firenze, Passigli, 1993. .

Quotes
"Italy has awaited this since 1866 her truly national war, in order to feel unified at last, renewed by the unanimous action and identical sacrifice of all her sons. Today, while Italy still wavers before the necessity imposed by history, the name of Garibaldi, resanctified by blood, rises again to warn her that she will not be able to defeat the revolution save by fighting and winning her national war." Federzoni, 1915, at memorial services being held for a relative of Italian national hero Giuseppe Garibaldi, called the "Hero of Two Worlds" because of his military enterprises in Brazil, Uruguay and Europe

References

External links

 

1878 births
1967 deaths
Politicians from Bologna
Italian Nationalist Association
Members of the Grand Council of Fascism
Italian Ministers of the Interior
Mussolini Cabinet
Deputies of Legislature XXIV of the Kingdom of Italy
Deputies of Legislature XXV of the Kingdom of Italy
Deputies of Legislature XXVI of the Kingdom of Italy
Deputies of Legislature XXVII of the Kingdom of Italy
Presidents of the Italian Senate
Members of the Senate of the Kingdom of Italy
20th-century Italian journalists
Italian male journalists
Members of the Royal Academy of Italy
Italian military personnel of World War I
Exiled Italian politicians